Belfast Ballynafeigh was a constituency of the Parliament of Northern Ireland.

Boundaries
Belfast Ballynafeigh was a borough constituency comprising part of southern Belfast.  It was created in 1929 when the House of Commons (Method of Voting and Redistribution of Seats) Act (Northern Ireland) 1929 introduced first past the post elections throughout Northern Ireland.

Belfast Ballynafeigh was created by the division of Belfast South into four new constituencies.  It survived unchanged, returning one member of Parliament, until the Parliament of Northern Ireland was temporarily suspended in 1972, and then formally abolished in 1973.

Politics
In common with other seats in south Belfast, the constituency was strongly unionist.  It was consistently won by Ulster Unionist Party candidates, although independent Unionst and labour candidates also stood.

Members of Parliament

Election results 

 Death of Moles

See also
 Ballynafeigh ward

References

Northern Ireland Parliament constituencies established in 1929
Constituencies of the Northern Ireland Parliament
Constituencies of the Northern Ireland Parliament in Belfast
Northern Ireland Parliament constituencies disestablished in 1973